David Whitton (born 22 April 1952) is a Scottish journalist, Labour Party politician and former Member of the Scottish Parliament (MSP). He was elected to the Scottish Parliament for Strathkelvin and Bearsden in 2007, defeating the incumbent Independent MSP Jean Turner, and losing the seat at the 2011 election to Fiona McLeod of the Scottish National Party.

Background
Whitton was educated at the Morgan Academy in Dundee. He began his journalistic career with D. C. Thomson in 1970 before moving to the Fife Free Press and then the Evening Express in Aberdeen, specialising in local government activities. He worked at The Scotsman in Glasgow for three years then moved to the Daily Record where he became Industrial Editor in 1983. From 1986–96, Whitton worked at Scottish Television in a variety of roles including producer of news and current affairs programmes, Lobby Correspondent at Westminster, presenter of political programming and on screen news reporter. He was Head of Public Affairs from 1994–96. Whitton's time at Scottish Television was followed by a short period as a Director of the PR company, Media House. David Whitton is married and has two children and two grandchildren. He is a member of the National Union of Journalists.

Political career
In 1999 Whitton became Special Adviser to the then Scottish Secretary Donald Dewar. Whitton was a member of Scottish Labour Party's Scottish Parliament election campaign responsible for organising broadcasting coverage and media activity for the Party leader.

Following the first Scottish Parliament elections, Whitton became Special Adviser to the First Minister of Scotland, Donald Dewar and Official Spokesman for the First Minister and the Scottish Executive. Whitton delivered a reading at Dewar's funeral at Glasgow Cathedral on 18 October 2000.

In 2000, Whitton established his own public affairs consultancy with clients including Scottish Enterprise, The Scottish Council for Development and Industry, The Al‑Maktoum Institute for Arabic and Islamic Studies. During this period, he was also a member of the committee raising funds for the Donald Dewar chair of Social Justice.

Member of the Scottish Parliament
Whitton was elected to the Scottish Parliament in May 2007 for the constituency of Strathkelvin and Bearsden becoming Parliamentary Aide to Wendy Alexander MSP until her resignation as party leader on 28 June 2008. In addition to a position as Deputy Labour Party Spokesperson on Finance, he was a substitute member of the Economy, Energy and Tourism Committee, Member of the Finance Committee, a member of the Labour Trade Union Group, and a board member of the Scottish Parliamentary Business Exchange.
In 2010/11 Whitton claimed more than £34,000 in expenses which was the sixth highest amount at the Scottish Parliament.

In the SNP landslide victory in the 2011 Scottish Parliament election, he lost his seat to Fiona McLeod, on a swing of 7.7%.

Career timeline

Rathfern Road Primary, London, (1957–63)
Forest Hill School, London, 1963
Morgan Academy, Dundee (1963–70)
Journalist, Dundee Courier, Fife Free Press, Kirkcaldy and Evening Express, Aberdeen (1970–78)
Reporter, The Scotsman, (1978–81)
Industrial Reporter, Daily Record (1981–83)
Industrial Editor, Daily Record, (1983–86)
Reporter, presenter, producer, Scottish Television (1986–94)
Head of Public Affairs, Scottish Television (1994–96)
Director, Media House (1996–98)
Special Adviser to Donald Dewar, First Minister (1998–2000)
managing director, Whitton PR Ltd (2000–2007)
Member of the Scottish Parliament (2007–2011)

References

External links 
 

1952 births
Living people
Labour MSPs
Members of the Scottish Parliament 2007–2011
Scottish journalists
Scottish public relations people
Scottish television presenters
Scottish television producers
Scottish special advisers
People educated at Morgan Academy
Scottish television executives
People from Forfar